Corethropsis elegans is a species of fungi of uncertain affinity within the division Ascomycota. It was described as associated with the sugarcane in Argentina.

References

External links 

 
 Corethropsis elegans at Index Fungarum
 

Fungi described in 1896
Ascomycota enigmatic taxa
Taxa named by Carlo Luigi Spegazzini